Chicago Valley is a valley in Inyo County, California. The Chicago Valley lies between the Resting Spring Range on the west and the Nopah Range on the east and north.

References

Valleys of Inyo County, California